Anne Bancroft (born Anna Maria Louisa Italiano; September 17, 1931 – June 6, 2005) was an American actress. Bancroft received an Academy Award, three BAFTA Awards, two Golden Globe Awards, two Tony Awards, two Primetime Emmy Awards, and a Cannes Film Festival Award. She is one of only 24 thespians to achieve the Triple Crown of Acting.

Associated with the method acting technique, having studied under Lee Strasberg at the Actors Studio, Bancroft made her film debut in the noir thriller Don't Bother to Knock in 1952, and then appeared in 14 other films over the following five years. In 1958 Bancroft made her Broadway debut with the play Two for the Seesaw, winning the Tony Award for Best Featured Actress in a Play. The following year she portrayed Anne Sullivan in the original Broadway production of The Miracle Worker, winning the Tony Award for Best Actress in a Play. Following her continued success on stage, Bancroft's film career was revived when she was cast in the acclaimed film adaptation of The Miracle Worker (1962) for which she won the Academy Award for Best Actress. Her film career further progressed with Oscar nominated performances in The Pumpkin Eater (1964), The Graduate (1967),  The Turning Point (1977), and Agnes of God (1985).

Bancroft continued to act in the later half of her life, with prominent roles in The Elephant Man (1980), To Be or Not to Be (1983), Garbo Talks (1984), 84 Charing Cross Road (1987), Torch Song Trilogy (1988), Home for the Holidays (1995), G.I. Jane (1997), Great Expectations (1998), and Up at the Villa (2000). She received multiple Primetime Emmy Award nominations, including for the television films Broadway Bound (1992), Deep in My Heart (1999), for which she won, and The Roman Spring of Mrs. Stone (2003). Bancroft died on June 6, 2005, at the age of 73, as a result of uterine cancer. She was married to director, actor, and writer Mel Brooks, with whom she had a son named Max.

Early life
Bancroft was born Anna Maria Louisa (or Luisa) Italiano on September 17, 1931, in the Bronx, New York City, the middle of three daughters of Mildred (née Di Napoli), a telephone operator, and Michael G. Italiano, a dress pattern maker. Her parents were Italian immigrants from Southern Italy. In an interview, she stated that her family was originally from Muro Lucano, in the province of Potenza. She was of Roman Catholic faith.

Bancroft was raised in Little Italy, in the Belmont neighborhood of the Bronx, attended P.S. 12, later moving to 1580 Zerega Ave. and graduating from Christopher Columbus High School in 1948. She later attended HB Studio, the American Academy of Dramatic Arts, the Actors Studio and the American Film Institute's Directing Workshop for Women at the University of California, Los Angeles. After appearing in a number of live television dramas, including Studio One and The Goldbergs under the name Anne Marno, later, at Darryl Zanuck's insistence, she chose the less Mediterranean surname of Bancroft "because it sounded dignified".

Career
Bancroft made her screen debut with a major role in the 1952 Marilyn Monroe vehicle Don't Bother to Knock. She appeared in 14 films over the next five years, including Treasure of the Golden Condor (1953), Gorilla at Large (1954), Demetrius and the Gladiators (1954), New York Confidential (1955) and Walk the Proud Land (1956). In 1957, Bancroft was directed by Jacques Tourneur in a David Goodis adaptation, Nightfall. In 1958, she made her Broadway debut as lovelorn, Bronx-accented Gittel Mosca opposite Henry Fonda (as the married man Gittel loves) in William Gibson's two-character play Two for the Seesaw, directed by Arthur Penn. For this role, she won the Tony Award for Best Performance by a Featured Actress in a Play.

Bancroft won the Tony Award for Best Performance by a Leading Actress in a Play in 1960, again with playwright Gibson and director Penn, when she played Annie Sullivan, the young woman who teaches the child Helen Keller to communicate in The Miracle Worker. She appeared in the 1962 film version of the play and won the 1962 Academy Award for Best Actress, with Patty Duke repeating her own success as Keller alongside Bancroft. Because Bancroft had returned to Broadway to star in Mother Courage and Her Children, Joan Crawford accepted the Oscar on her behalf and later presented the award to her in New York.

Bancroft co-starred as a medieval nun obsessed with a priest (Jason Robards) in the 1965 Broadway production of John Whiting's play The Devils. Produced by Alexander H. Cohen and directed by Michael Cacoyannis, it ran for 63 performances.

Bancroft received a second Academy Award nomination for her performance in The Pumpkin Eater (1964).

Bancroft was widely known during this period for her role as Mrs. Robinson in The Graduate (1967), for which she received a third Academy Award nomination. In the film, she played an unhappily married woman who seduces the son of her husband's business partner, the much younger recent college graduate played by Dustin Hoffman. In the movie, Hoffman's character later dates and falls in love with her daughter. Bancroft was ambivalent about her appearance in The Graduate; she said in several interviews that the role overshadowed her other work. Despite her character becoming an archetype of the "older woman" role, Bancroft was only eight years older than her onscreen daughter Katharine Ross, and just six years older than Hoffman.

A CBS television special, Annie: the Women in the Life of a Man (1970), won Bancroft an Emmy Award for her singing and acting. Bancroft was also a serious candidate to play Chris MacNeil in The Exorcist, but the filmmakers rejected her request to postpone the film’s shoot due to her being pregnant with her son Max.

Bancroft is one of ten actors to have won both an Academy Award and a Tony Award for the same role (as Annie Sullivan in The Miracle Worker), and one of very few entertainers to win an Oscar, an Emmy and a Tony award. This rare achievement is also known as the Triple Crown of Acting.
She followed that success with a second television special, Annie and the Hoods (1974), which was telecast on ABC and featured her husband Mel Brooks as a guest star. She made an uncredited cameo in the film Blazing Saddles (1974), directed by Brooks. She received a fourth Academy Award nomination for Best Actress for her performance in The Turning Point (1977), and a fifth nomination for Best Actress for her performance in Agnes of God (1985).

Bancroft made her debut as a screenwriter and director in Fatso (1980), in which she starred with Dom DeLuise.

Bancroft was the original choice to play Joan Crawford in the film Mommie Dearest (1981), but backed out and was replaced by Faye Dunaway. She was also a front-runner for the role of Aurora Greenway in Terms of Endearment (1983), but declined so that she could act in the remake of To Be or Not to Be (1983) with Brooks. In 1988, she played Harvey Fierstein's mother in the film version of his play Torch Song Trilogy.

During the 1990s and early 2000s, Bancroft took supporting roles in a number of films in which she co-starred with major film stars, including Honeymoon in Vegas (1992), Love Potion No. 9 (1992), Malice (1993), Point of No Return (1993), Home for the Holidays (1995), How to Make an American Quilt (1995), G.I. Jane (1997), Great Expectations (1998), Keeping the Faith (2000), Up at the Villa (2000) and Heartbreakers (2001). She also lent her voice to the animated film Antz (1998).

Bancroft also starred in several television movies and miniseries, receiving six Emmy Award nominations (winning once for herself and shared for Annie, The Women in the Life of a Man), eight Golden Globe nominations (winning twice) and two Screen Actors Guild Awards.

Bancroft's last appearance was as herself in a 2004 episode of HBO's Curb Your Enthusiasm. She was cast in Spanglish (2004) later that year, but had to bow out due to a medical emergency. Her last project was the animated feature film Delgo, released posthumously in 2008. The film was dedicated to her.

Bancroft received a star on the Hollywood Walk of Fame at 6368 Hollywood Boulevard for her work in television. At the time of her star's installation in 1960, she had recently appeared in several TV series. Bancroft was also a member of the American Theater Hall of Fame, having been inducted in 1992.

Personal life

Bancroft's first husband was lawyer Martin May, of Lubbock, Texas; they married on July 1, 1953, separated in November 1955 and divorced on February 13, 1957. She had previously been engaged to actor John Ericson in 1951. Lee Marvin's ex-wife Betty claimed in her 2010 book Tales of a Hollywood Housewife that Marvin had an affair with Bancroft when they co-starred in Gorilla at Large (1954) and A Life in the Balance (1955).

In 1961, Bancroft met Mel Brooks at a rehearsal for Perry Como's variety show Kraft Music Hall. Bancroft and Brooks married on August 5, 1964, at the Manhattan Marriage Bureau near New York City Hall, and remained married until her death. Their son, Max Brooks, was born in 1972.

Bancroft worked with her husband three times on the screen: dancing a tango in Brooks's Silent Movie (1976), in his remake of To Be or Not to Be (1983) and in the episode entitled "Opening Night" (2004) of the HBO show Curb Your Enthusiasm. The couple also appeared in Dracula: Dead and Loving It (1995), but never appeared together. Brooks produced the film The Elephant Man (1980), in which Bancroft acted. He was executive producer for the film 84 Charing Cross Road (1987) in which she starred. Both Brooks and Bancroft appeared in Season 6 of The Simpsons. According to the DVD commentary, when Bancroft came to record her lines for the episode "Fear of Flying", the Simpsons writers asked if Brooks had come with her (which he had); she joked, "I can't get rid of him!"

In a 2010 interview, Brooks credited Bancroft as being the guiding force behind his involvement in developing The Producers and Young Frankenstein for the musical theater. In the same interview, he said of their first meeting in 1961, "From that day, until her death on June 6, 2005, we were glued together."

Bancroft's son, Max Brooks, said in a 2020 interview that she was "a secret, closet scientist". He said that, as a child, she read to him Paul de Kruif's "Microbe Hunters" (1926) as a bedtime story.
 
In 2005, shortly before her death, Bancroft became a grandmother when her daughter-in-law Michelle gave birth to a boy, Henry Michael Brooks.

Death
Bancroft died of uterine cancer at age 73 on June 6, 2005, at Mount Sinai Hospital in Manhattan. Her death surprised many, including some of her friends, as the intensely private Bancroft had not disclosed any details of her illness. Her body was interred at Kensico Cemetery in Valhalla, New York, near her parents, Mildred (who died in April 2010, five years after Anne) and Michael Italiano. Her final film, Delgo, was dedicated to her memory.

Filmography

Film
Sources:

Television

Theater
Source:

Awards and nominations

References

External links

 
 
 
 
 
 
 
 Anne Bancroft at the University of Wisconsin's Actors Studio audio collection
 Image of Sidney Poitier holding his Oscar alongside Gregory Peck, Annabella and Anne Bancroft backstage at the Academy Awards, Los Angeles, 1964. Los Angeles Times Photographic Archive (Collection 1429). UCLA Library Special Collections, Charles E. Young Research Library, University of California, Los Angeles.

1931 births
2005 deaths
20th Century Studios contract players
20th-century American actresses
21st-century American actresses
Actresses from New York City
American Academy of Dramatic Arts alumni
American film actresses
American people of Italian descent
American stage actresses
American television actresses
American voice actresses
Best Actress Academy Award winners
Best Actress BAFTA Award winners
Best Drama Actress Golden Globe (film) winners
Best Foreign Actress BAFTA Award winners
Best Musical or Comedy Actress Golden Globe (film) winners
Burials at Kensico Cemetery
Cannes Film Festival Award for Best Actress winners
Catholics from New York (state)
Deaths from cancer in New York (state)
Deaths from uterine cancer
Outstanding Performance by a Supporting Actress in a Miniseries or Movie Primetime Emmy Award winners
People from the Bronx
Tony Award winners
UCLA Film School alumni
Western (genre) film actresses